Jane Godwin (born 1964 in Melbourne, Australia) is an Australian author, and is a publisher at Penguin Books Australia for children and young adult books.

Godwin has sole-authored fifteen books which have been published internationally, and she has earned many commendations. Her novel The Family Tree won the 2000 Queensland Premier's Literary Award. Sebby, Stee, The Garbos and Me was shortlisted for the 1999 New South Wales State Literary Award (Patricia Wrightson Prize) and was also a Young Australian Best Book Award finalist. The True Story of Mary was shortlisted for the 2006 CBC Book of the Year Awards in the Younger Readers category. Sing Me The Summer was shortlisted for the Children's prize at the 2021 Indie Book Awards, while When Rain Turns to Snow was shortlisted for the 2021 CBCA Children's Book of the Year Award: Older Readers.

As well as being an author, Godwin loves being creative with students of all ages. She lives in Melbourne with her husband and has two children. Her son is Wil Wagner of The Smith Street Band and her daughter Lizzie Wagner is an accomplished interior and event designer.

Books

 The Family Tree (1998)
 Poor Fish (2000)
 When Anna Slept Over (2001)
 Millie Starts School (2001)
 Jessie and Mr Smith (2003)
 The Day I Turned Ten (2004)
 Minnie and The Super Guys (2004)
 The True Story of Mary (2005)
 When Elephants Lived In The Sea (2006)
 Falling from Grace (2006)
 Little Cat and the Big Red Bus (2008)
 Sam Sullivan's Scooter (2009)
 Where's Sunday? (2010)
 Today We Have No Plans (2012)
 Starting School (2013)
 How Big is Too Small? (2016)
 Go Go and the Silver Shoes (2018)
 What Do You Wish For? (2018)
 As Happy as Here (2019)
 Sing Me The Summer (2020)
 When Rain Turns to Snow (2020)

References

External links
 Author Profile at Penguin Books

1964 births
Living people
20th-century Australian novelists
21st-century Australian novelists
Australian children's writers
Australian women novelists
Writers from Melbourne
20th-century Australian women writers
21st-century Australian women writers